The Examiner is a weekly newspaper founded in 1989 and delivered on Thursdays and Fridays in the south-eastern suburbs of Perth, Western Australia.

The edition covering Armadale, Serpentine-Jarrahdale and Gosnells has a circulation of 59,993 and is delivered on Thursdays. The Wednesday edition covers the City of Canning with a circulation of 29,539.
It is owned by Gerald van Rongen.

References

Mentiplay, Mark, "Independents take on Community", Western Australian Business News, 28 September 2005.

Newspapers published in Perth, Western Australia
1989 establishments in Australia